Allen Banks & Staward Gorge  is National Trust property in the English county of Northumberland.

It is a Victorian garden in a gorge of the River Allen cutting through woodland. The ruins of Staward Peel, a medieval peel tower, stand on a promontory above the gorge. The property has been designated a Site of Special Scientific Interest for its rich flora and fauna. There is a large suspension bridge which has been ruined by the flooding of January 2005.

External links 
Allen Banks & Staward Gorge information at the National Trust
Further info

National Trust properties in Northumberland
Nature reserves in Northumberland
Sites of Special Scientific Interest in Northumberland